Dynamo Kharkiv may refer to

 FC Dynamo Kharkiv
 HC Dynamo Kharkiv
 Dynamo Kharkiv (bandy)